Haley is an unincorporated community in Bedford County, in the U.S. state of Tennessee.

History
Variant names were "Haleys Station", Haleys Woodyard", and "Maupins Station". A post office called Haley's Station was established in 1868, the name was changed to Haley in 1882, and the post office closed in 1936. The community had a depot on the Nashville and Chattanooga Railway.

References

Unincorporated communities in Bedford County, Tennessee
Unincorporated communities in Tennessee